Martin Pearson (born 24 October 1971) is a former professional rugby league and rugby union footballer who played in the 1990s and 2000s.

Playing career

International honours
Pearson won four caps for Wales between 1998 and 2001, scoring two tries and two goals.

Division Two Premiership Final appearances
Martin Pearson played  and scored four conversions in Featherstone Rovers' 20-16 victory over Workington Town in the 1992–93 Division Two Premiership Final at Old Trafford, Manchester on Wednesday 19 May 1993.

Career Records
Martin Pearson holds Featherstone Rovers' 'The Most Points In A Season' record, with 391-points scored in the 1992–93 season.

References

External links
(archived by web.archive.org) Martin Pearson interview at wakefieldwildcats.co.uk
2001 Super League Team-by-team guide

1971 births
Living people
Featherstone Rovers players
Halifax R.L.F.C. players
Sheffield Eagles (1984) players
Wakefield Trinity players
Wales national rugby league team players
Footballers who switched code
Section Paloise players
RC Toulonnais players
Place of birth missing (living people)
Rugby league centres
Rugby league five-eighths
Rugby league fullbacks
Rugby league halfbacks